The 1967 Indiana Hoosiers football team represented Indiana University in the 1967 Big Ten Conference football season. They participated as members of the Big Ten Conference. The Hoosiers played their home games at Seventeenth Street Stadium in Bloomington, Indiana. The team was coached by John Pont, in his third year as head coach of the Hoosiers. To date, they were the last Indiana team to win the Big Ten Conference, and the last non Michigan or Ohio State team to win the league title (and consequently represent the conference in the Rose Bowl) until the 1981 Iowa Hawkeyes football team won the conference crown.

In the battle for the Old Oaken Bucket, Indiana beat Purdue.

Schedule

Roster
16 Harry Gonso;
17 John Isenbarger;
18 Mike Perry;
20 Jay Mathias;21 Benny Norman;
21 Gary Nichols;
22 Nate Cunningham;
23 Dave Kornowa;
24 Bob Douglas;
26 Dave Evans;
31 Bill Huff;
32 Bob Nichols;
33 Mike Baughman;35 Mike Krivoshia;
37 Kevin Duffy;
38 Bob Moynihan;
39 Lee Robinson;40 Jade Butcher;
42 Don Warner;
44 Roger Grove;
45 Mike Adams;
47 Mike Deal;
48 Terry Cole;
49 Cal Wilson;
50 Mike Roth;
51 Harold Mauro;
52 Ken Kaczmarek;
53 Steve Applegate;
54 Karl Pankratz;
55 Cordell Gill;
57 Dan Bueter;
58 Ted Verlihay;
60 Jerry Grecco;
61 Cal Snowden;
62 E.G. White;
63 Don DeSalle;
64 Bob Russell;
68 Gary Cassells;
70 Bill Bergman;
72 Bob Kirk;
74 Al Schmidt;
75 Doug Rhodus;
76 Ed Harrison;
78 Doug Crusan;
79 Rick Spickard;
80 Tom Bilunas;
81 Al Gage;
83 Jim Sniadecki;
84 Brown Marks;
86 Bill McCaa;
87 Al Kamradt;
89 Eric Stolberg;91 Ron Easterley;
96 Clarence Price;97 Bill Wolfe;
Greg Thaxton;
Harold Dunn;
John Perry;

Game summaries

Kentucky

Kansas

at Illinois

Iowa

at Michigan

at Arizona

Wisconsin

at Michigan State

at Minnesota

No. 3 Purdue

Indiana was voted to the Rose Bowl a few hours after the win.

USC (Rose Bowl)

1968 NFL draftees

Awards and honors
John Pont, Eddie Robinson Coach of the Year
John Pont, Paul "Bear" Bryant Award
John Pont, Walter Camp Coach of the Year

References

Indiana
Indiana Hoosiers football seasons
Big Ten Conference football champion seasons
Indiana Hoosiers football